The Canadian Journal of Microbiology is a monthly peer-reviewed scientific journal covering all aspects of microbiology. It was established in 1954 and is published by NRC Research Press. The editors-in-chief are Kari Dunfield (University of Guelph) and Christopher K. Yost (University of Regina). The founding editor (serving from 1954 to 1960) was Robert George Everett Murray (1919–2022).

Abstracting and indexing
The journal is abstracted and indexed in:

According to the Journal Citation Reports, the journal has a 2021 impact factor of 3.226.

References

External links

Microbiology journals
Monthly journals
Publications established in 1954
Canadian Science Publishing academic journals
English-language journals